Velesh Kola (also Romanized as Velesh Kolā) is a village in Miandorud-e Kuchak Rural District, in the Central District of Sari County, Mazandaran Province, Iran. In 2006, its population was 887, in 242 families.

References 

Populated places in Sari County